Glabellula crassicornis is a species of micro bee flies in the family Mythicomyiidae.

References

Mythicomyiidae
Articles created by Qbugbot
Insects described in 1924